Minolops is a genus of sea snails, marine gastropod mollusks in the family Solariellidae within the superfamily Trochoidea, the top snails, turban snails and their allies.

B.A. Marshall (1999) thought that Minolops may be synonymous with Spectamen

Species
Species within the genus Minolops include:
 Minolops arata Hedley, 1903
 Minolops casta (Nevill & Nevill, 1874) 
 Minolops cinerea (Preston, 1909)
 Minolops corallina (Cotton & Godfrey, 1935)
 Minolops gertruda Iredale, 1936
 Minolops pulcherrima Angas, 1869
 Minolops rosulenta (Watson, 1883)
Species brought into synonymy
 Minolops cincta (Cotton, B.C. & F.K. Godfrey, 1938): synonym of Minolia cincta (Cotton & Godfrey, 1938)
 Minolops emendata (Iredale, 1924): synonym of Minolops pulcherrima emendata  (Iredale, 1924)

References

 Iredale, 1929 Records of the Australian Museum, 17(4): 169

External links
 To World Register of Marine Species

 
Solariellidae
Gastropod genera